Ida Victoria Karkiainen (born 10 May 1988) is a Swedish politician for the Social Democratic party. Since 30 November 2021 she is the Minister for Public Administration in Magdalena Andersson's cabinet, replacing Lena Micko.

Karkiainen is in a relationship with musician Mattias "Buffeln" Lind who is a member of the industrial metal band Raubtier. Her connection to the band and their violent and nationalistic lyrics and hard partying lifestyle has created some controversy in Swedish media.

References

Living people
Swedish politicians
Swedish people of Finnish descent
1988 births
People from Haparanda Municipality
Women government ministers of Sweden
Members of the Riksdag 2014–2018
Members of the Riksdag 2018–2022
Members of the Riksdag 2022–2026
21st-century Swedish women politicians
Women members of the Riksdag